Adamae Vaughn (November 8, 1905 – September 11, 1943), also billed as Ada Mae Vaughn, was an American actress.

Early years 
Her sister was film actress Alberta Vaughn. Adamae was at first Alberta's manager and chaperone. When the studio needed a brunette, Adamae, a blonde, sent her sister.

Actress
Vaughn was named a WAMPAS Baby Star of 1927. She was in nine movies between 1921 and 1936, including The Courtship of Miles Standish (1923) and The Last Edition (1925). Dancing Sweeties (1930) was produced by First National Pictures and Vitaphone and  featured Sue Carol and Grant Withers. Vaughn played Emma O'Neil.

In September 1929, she was a member of a Warner Brothers review featuring sisters who were actresses. Together with Alberta, she was featured with Dolores Costello, Helene Costello, Shirley Mason, Viola Dana, Loretta Young, Sally Blane, and others.

Marriage
She married Albert R. Hindman, a Los Angeles, California, businessman, in May 1926. They divorced in October 1927. A reconciliation schedule for early 1928 was cancelled.

In June 1934, Vaughn wed Hollywood automobile executive Joseph Valentine Roul Fleur D'Anvray (also known as Viscount D'Anvray), who came from a noble family in Anvray, France. He was a French author and a representative of General Motors in Europe. After their marriage, Vaughn accompanied her husband to live in France. They divorced in October 1940.

Death
In April 1937, Vaughn underwent abdominal surgery, which left her with multiple adhesions. Complications from this operation eventually landed her in the Hollywood Hospital located in Studio City, California. Vaughn died on September 11, 1943, from an intestinal blockage.

Filmography

References
 
Los Angeles Times, "New Baby Stars Stud Hollywood Firmamament", January 7, 1927, page A1.
Los Angeles Times, "Film Girls Cast In Bride Roles", January 24, 1928, page A5.
Los Angeles Times, "Baby Star To Be Guest", June 12, 1929, page A18.
Los Angeles Times, "Film Actress Will Be Bride", June 13, 1934, page A1.
Los Angeles Times, "Mrs. Adamae Vaughn", September 14, 1943, page 18.
The New York Times, "Mamoulian's Camera",  September 22, 1929, X5.
Syracuse Herald, "Baby Star Will Become Bride of French Nobleman", Sunday Morning, May 26, 1929, Fourth Section, page 10.
The Washington Post, "Will Osborne And A Breezy Camera Play", July 20, 1930, page A2.

External links

American film actresses
American silent film actresses
Actresses from Kentucky
People from Ashland, Kentucky
1905 births
1943 deaths
Burials at Forest Lawn Memorial Park (Glendale)
20th-century American actresses
WAMPAS Baby Stars